Longitarsus cinerariae is a species of beetle in the subfamily Galerucinae that is endemic to Madeira.

References

C
Beetles described in 1854
Endemic fauna of Madeira
Taxa named by Thomas Vernon Wollaston